Zinc finger protein 444 is a protein that in humans is encoded by the ZNF444 gene.

Function

This gene encodes a zinc finger protein which activates transcription of a scavenger receptor gene involved in the degradation of acetylated low-density lipoprotein (Ac-LDL). This gene is located in a cluster of zinc finger genes on chromosome 19 at q13.4. A pseudogene of this gene is located on chromosome 15. Multiple transcript variants encoding different isoforms have been found for this gene.

References

Further reading 

Human proteins
Zinc finger proteins